Kwangwoon Electronic Technical High School is a public technical, all-male high school located in Nowon-gu, a district in the northeastern area of Seoul, South Korea. It is a three-year training school with approximately 1,100 students and a teaching staff of about 100.

History
Founded in 1934, it shares a lineage and history with Kwangwoon University and was originally its high school section. In December 1964, the current name was adopted. It received recognition as a training school specializing in the STEM fields, specifically engineering.

Notable alumni
Chang Hyuk-jin, footballer
Ha Seok-ju, retired footballer
Noh Haeng-seok, footballer
Park Joo-ho, footballer

References

External links
Homepage

High schools in Seoul
Technical schools
Educational institutions established in 1934
Nowon District
1934 establishments in Korea
Boys' schools in South Korea